Black widow may refer to:

Spiders
 Black widow spider, a common name for some species of spiders in the genus Latrodectus

American species
 Latrodectus apicalis, the Galapagos black widow
 Latrodectus curacaviensis, the South American black widow
 Latrodectus hesperus, the western black widow
 Latrodectus mactans, the southern black widow
 Latrodectus variolus, the northern black widow

Eurasian species
 Latrodectus tredecimguttatus, the Mediterranean black widow or European black widow

Oceanian species
 Latrodectus hasseltii, the redback spider or Australian black widow

People
 Black Widow (Chechnya), also known as Shahidka, female suicide bombers from Chechnya or Dagestan
 Florentine Rost van Tonningen (1914–2007), Dutch neo-Nazi nicknamed Zwarte weduwe (Black Widow)

Murderers
 Black Widows of Liverpool, two women  hanged for murder in 1884
 Belle Gunness, 25-40 victims spanning from 1884 to 1908
 Vera Renczi (1903-1960), murdered 35 men, including her husband and her son
 Betty Neumar (1931–2011), dubbed "Black Widow" or "Black Widow Granny", accused of murdering one of her husbands
 Blanche Taylor Moore (born 1933), convicted murderer
 Griselda Blanco (1943–2012), Colombian drug trafficker, known for her ordering or committing the murders of three ex-husbands
 Catherine Nevin (1950-2018), responsible for the 1996 murder of Tom Nevin in Jack White's Inn
 Stacey Castor (born 1967), convicted murderer
 Lynn Turner (murderer) (1968–2010), convicted murderer
 Black Widow Murders, murders committed in 1999/2005 by two elderly women in Los Angeles
 Áurea Vázquez-Rijos who hired a hitman for the Murder of Adam Anhang in 2005, extradited back to Puerto Rico in 2015 and convicted in 2018
 Melissa Ann Shepard (born 1935), Canadian murderer
 Patrizia Reggiani (born 1948), ex-wife of Maurizio Gucci convicted of arranging his murder
 Chisako Kakehi (born 1946), Japanese serial killer currently awaiting execution for three murders
 Lyda Southard, American serial killer of husbands of other family members using arsenic from flypaper

Athletes
 Jeanette Lee (pool player) (born 1971), so-called because of her fondness for wearing black
 Sonya Thomas (born 1967), top-ranked competitive eater

Arts and entertainment

Fictional characters
 Black Widow (Marvel Comics), the name of several distinct characters:
 Black Widow (Claire Voyant)
 Black Widow (Natasha Romanova)
 Black Widow (Yelena Belova)
 In the :
 Natasha Romanoff (Marvel Cinematic Universe)
 Yelena Belova (Marvel Cinematic Universe)
 Melina Vostokoff (Marvel Cinematic Universe)
 Dottie Underwood
 The Black Widow, a Batman villain played by Tallulah Bankhead
 Black Widow, a character from the Saturday Night Slam Masters series of games by Capcom

Film and television
 The Black Widow (serial), a 1947 movie serial starring Bruce Edwards
 The Black Widow (1951 film), a British film starring Christine Norden
 Black Widow (1954 film), starring Ginger Rogers and Gene Tierney
 Black Widow (1987 film), featuring Debra Winger and Theresa Russell
 Black Widow (2003 film), a film directed by Brad Turner
 The Black Widow (2005 film), DVD release title of film by Giada Colagrande, produced as Before It Had a Name
 Black Widow (2005 film), a Canadian film starring Sarah Slean
 "The Black Widow", an episode of Boston Legal
 Black Widow (2007 film), with Elizabeth Berkley and Alicia Coppola
 Black Widow (2010 film), starring Jack Scalia and Jennifer O'Dell
 Black Widows (TV series), 2016 Scandinavian  TV serial
 Black Widow (2021 film), a film starring Scarlett Johansson based on the Marvel Comics character
 Black Widow: A Land Bleeds, a 2017 Indian film

Literature
 The Black Widow (Silva novel), 2016 novel by Daniel Silva
 Black Widow: A Novel, a 1981 novel by Christina Crawford

Gaming
 Black Widow (video game), a 1982 Atari arcade game
 Black Widow Games, a computer games developer

Music
 Black Widow (opera), by Thomas Pasatieri
 Black Widow (band), a British rock band
 Black Widow (Black Widow album), 1971
 Black Widow (Lalo Schifrin album), 1976
 Black Widow (In This Moment album), 2014
 The Black Widow (album)
 Black Widow Records, an Italian label
 Black Widows (band), Minneapolis surf-punk band

Songs
 "Black Widow" (Iggy Azalea song), 2014
 "Black Widow" (Pristin song), 2017
 "Black Widow", by Black Tide on the album Light from Above
 "Black Widow", by Mötley Crüe on the compilation Red, White & Crüe
 "Black Widow", by Children of Bodom on the album Hatebreeder
 "Black Widow", by U.D.O. on the album Animal House
 "Black Widow", by Dolores O'Riordan on the album Are You Listening?
 "Black Widow", by Donovan Leitch on the album Slow Down World
 "Black Widow", by In This Moment on the album Black Widow
 "Black Widow", by Lita Ford on the album Dangerous Curves
 "Black Widow", by Michelle Shocked on the album Short Sharp Shocked
 "Black Widow", by Alice Cooper on the album Welcome to My Nightmare
 "Black Widow", by Jefferson Starship on the album Winds of Change
 "Black Widow", by Booty Luv
 "Black Widow", by Link Wray and His Ray Men, B-side to "Jack the Ripper"
 "Black Widow", by Cage the Elephant on the album Melophobia
 "Black Widow", by Susanne Sundfør on the album The Brothel
 "Black Widow Pt. 2", by RZA featuring ODB on the album Digital Bullet
 "Black Widows", by Grave Digger on the album The Last Supper

Rides
 Black Widow (ride), an amusement ride at Kennywood
 Black Widow, a roller coaster at Six Flags New England

Military
 Northrop P-61 Black Widow, a World War II night fighter
 Black Widow II, a Northrop YF-23 prototype fighter aircraft
 PMN mine, nicknamed Black Widow because of their dark casing
 Soviet submarine B-39, nicknamed Black Widow after having been sold off as a museum ship
 421st Fighter Squadron, nicknamed Black Widows

Other plants and animals
 Black tetra, also known as "black widow tetra", a freshwater fish
 Stygnobrotula latebricola, an ocean fish
 Geranium phaeum, a herbaceous plant species

Other uses
 The Black Widow Pulsar, a pulsar
 Black Widow (paint mix), paint mix for projection screen
 DHD(J), also called Black Widow, a subgroup of the militant Dimasa organization Dima Halim Daoga of Assam, India

See also
 Black Widower (disambiguation)

Animal common name disambiguation pages
Lists of people by nickname